Astrothelium cayennense is a species of corticolous (bark-dwelling) lichen in the family Trypetheliaceae. Found in French Guiana, it was formally described as a new species in 2019 by lichenologists André Aptroot and Harrie Sipman. It has pyriform ascomata, measuring 0.8–1.3 mm in diameter, which are immersed in pseudostromata. The ascospores are hyaline, ellipsoid in shape, muriform (i.e., divided into chambers) and measure 295–330 by 35–40 μm. The specific epithet cayennense refers to the type locality.

References

cayennense
Lichen species
Lichens described in 2019
Lichens of French Guiana
Taxa named by André Aptroot
Taxa named by Harrie Sipman